Events in the year 1287 in Norway.

Incumbents
Monarch: Eric II Magnusson

Events

Arts and literature

Births

Deaths
Ingeborg of Denmark, Queen of Norway, Queen consort (born c. 1244).

References

Norway